The Xplorer, or Ohio Xplorer, was a named train of the New York Central Railroad (NYC) that traveled  between Cleveland and Cincinnati, Ohio. Although the railroad first announced the train in its April 29, 1956, timetable, that timetable did not contain its schedule.  The train entered revenue service on June 3, 1956.

Equipment
The Pullman-Standard Car Manufacturing Company constructed the train's streamlined coaches to its lightweight Train-X design. A Baldwin RP-210 diesel-hydraulic locomotive pulled the train's consist.

The train contained the locomotive and nine short all-aluminum coaches that were articulated together. The center car had two axles (one at each end), with the remaining cars having a single axle each, being supported by adjacent cars at the end opposite the axle. The ride was rough, as with most of the other lightweight trains of the period, and the train was not a success.

Operations 
The NYC's July 15, 1956, timetable was the first to contain the train's schedule. The train, numbered 421 southwest-bound and 422 northeast-bound on the timetable, was an attempt by the New York Central to modernize intrastate rail travel in Ohio and lure people out of their cars.

The train made its last run on August 17, 1957, after less than 15 months of operations. As a result, the train's name (Ohio-Xplorer or Xplorer) did not appear on the railroad's October 27, 1957, timetable. 

The equipment was retired in 1960, and was sold to Jones Tours for excursion service. After a long period of storage in South Carolina, the train and locomotive were scrapped around 1970.

See also
Ohio Hub
Ohio State Limited

Notes

References

External links
Xplorer engine 1956
Xplorer Stewardess 1956
Xplorer Columbus 1956
Xplorer rear of train
Xplorer car connection
Xplorer Locomotive data display 1956

Passenger trains of the New York Central Railroad
Transportation in Cleveland
Transportation in Ohio
Vehicles introduced in 1956
Articulated passenger trains
North American streamliner trains
Named passenger trains of the United States